Warchest is a box set from the American heavy metal band Megadeth. Warchest features five discs (4 CD + DVD) and features studio tracks, demos and live recordings of a number of the band's songs from its first ten studio albums and rarities EP. The box set was released on October 9, 2007 by EMI/Capitol Records, and sold around 1,100 copies in the United States in its first week.

While the content on discs 1–3 is assorted, disc 4 was recorded live at Wembley Arena, London, England, on October 14, 1990. The "Clash Of The Titans Tour" also featured Suicidal Tendencies, Anthrax and Slayer during the European leg. Disc 5 is a DVD, and features a concert recorded at Hammersmith Odeon, London, England, on September 30, 1992.

Reception

Jason Birchmeier of Allmusic noted that the set offers "something for everyone – from longtime fans to neophytes". Birchmeyer reserved special praise for disc 4, a 1990 concert at Wembley Arena in London. He described the concert as "amazing" and noted the stereo separation of the guitars, and an appearance by Sean Harris of Diamond Head.

Track listing
All music and lyrics by Dave Mustaine, except where noted

Personnel 
 Dave Mustaine – guitars, lead vocals, acoustic guitar
 David Ellefson – bass, backing vocals on discs 1, 2, 4, 5 and tracks 1–15 on disc 3
 Chris Poland – lead guitar on tracks 1–5 on disc 1 and tracks 16–17 on disc 3
 Gar Samuelson – drums on tracks 1–5 on disc 1
 Jeff Young – lead guitar on tracks 6–11 on disc 1
 Chuck Behler – drums on tracks 6–11, 14 on disc 1
 Nick Menza – drums on tracks discs 2, 4, 5, tracks 12–13, tracks 15–17 on disc 1, and tracks 1–4, 6 on disc 3
 Marty Friedman – lead guitar on discs 2, 4, 5, tracks 13–14, tracks 15–17 on disc 1, and tracks 1–9 on disc 3
 Jimmy DeGrasso – drums on tracks 5, 7–14 on disc 3
 Al Pitrelli – lead guitar on tracks 10–14 on disc 3
 Jimmy Lee Sloas – bass on tracks 16–17 on disc 3
 Vinnie Colaiuta – drums on tracks 16–17 on disc 3

Chart positions

References

2007 compilation albums
Megadeth compilation albums